GTP binding protein 6 also known as GTPBP6 is a protein which in humans is encoded by the pseudoautosomal GTPBP6 gene.

Clinical significance 

Overexpression of GTPBP6 as a result of Klinefelter's syndrome (one or more extra X-chromosomes) is inversely correlated with verbal ability.

References

Further reading